Khawaja Pervez, 
(28 December 1930 – 20 June 2011) was a prominent Pakistani film composer- lyricist and film songwriter for both Urdu and Punjabi language films. His real name was Khawaja Ghulam Mohiuddin. His professional career span was over 40 years.

Early life
Khawaja Ghulam Muhayyudin, popularly known as Khawaja Pervaiz was born into a Kashmiri Muslim Family in Amritsar, Punjab, British India. After independence of Pakistan in 1947, his family along with him moved to Lahore. He graduated from Dayal Singh College, Lahore in 1954.

Career
Khawaja Pervaiz's college friend Zafar Iqbal who was a son of film director Wali Sahib introduced him to his father who later hired him as an assistant. He worked with Wali Sahib while the latter was making Guddi Gudda (1956 film), Lukan Miti (1959) and Sohni Kumharan (1960).

Khawaja Pervez's first film, as a lyricist, was Diljeet Mirza's Rawaj in 1965 in Pakistan. He got a big breakthrough from the song "Tum hee ho mehboob meray" in film Aina (1966) sung by Irene Perveen and Masood Rana, music by Manzoor Ashraf, later known as music director M Ashraf. His songs included "Sunn Wey Balori Akh Waleya", "Jub Koi Pyar Sai Bulai Ga, Tum Ko Aik Shakhs Yaad Aiy Ga", "Kisay Da Yaar Na Wichray", "Mahi Aavey Gaa,Main Phullaan Naal Dharti Sajawan Gi", "Meri Chichi Da Challa Mahi La Layaa" and "Do Dil Ik Doojay Kolun Door Ho Gayey", "Teray Bina Yuun Gharian Beetin,Jaisay Saddian Beet Gaeiin", "Jan-e-Jan Tu Jo Kahay,Gaaoon Mein Geet Naey", "Dil-e- Veeran Hay, Teri Yaad Hay, Tanhai Hai".....etc.

He had written more than fifteen thousand film songs in his lifetime over a career of over 40 years, out of which five thousand plus film songs were sung by Noor Jehan alone. He was a well-sought-after and popular film songwriter and his songs were sung by almost all well-known vocalists of the time including Mehdi Hassan, Masood Rana, Ahmed Rushdi, Nahid Akhtar, Mehnaz, Runa Laila, Mala (Pakistani singer), Nayyara Noor, Inayat Hussain Bhatti, Musarrat Nazir and many others.
Most of the popular Qawwali songs performed by the renowned Nusrat Fateh Ali Khan were written by Khawaja Pervez.

Some of his popular songs

Death and legacy
Pervez died at the Mayo Hospital, Lahore after a protracted illness at age 78 due to a prolonged illness with asthma & diabetes. He left behind two widows, five sons, six daughters and five Nigar Awards. He was buried at Miani Sahib Graveyard in Lahore where a lot of showbiz celebrities were in attendance including folk singer Shaukat Ali, actors Iftikhar Thakur and Sohail Ahmed. Also present were famous film producers Syed Noor and Shehzad Rafiq. His fellow poet Riaz ur Rehman Saghar said that Khawaja Pervez always helped other artists in their difficult times.

Awards and recognition
 5 Nigar Awards for Best Lyricist in 1985, 1992, 1993, 1994 and 1995

References

External links
 Filmography of Khawaja Pervez on IMDb website

1930 births
2011 deaths
Pakistani songwriters
Pakistani lyricists
Punjabi people
Urdu-language poets from Pakistan
Punjabi-language poets
Burials at Miani Sahib Graveyard
Nigar Award winners